Anup Ghoshal is an Indian playback singer, composer in Hindi films and other vernacular Indian films, especially Bengali language films. He is known in his native Bengal primarily as one of the foremost Nazrulgeeti exponents, and was one of the foremost artistes of the 'golden age' of Nazrulgeeti (c. 1930s–1970s). He won the West Bengal Assembly elections of 2011 on a Trinamool Congress ticket from the Uttarpara (Vidhan Sabha constituency) in Hooghly district, defeating his nearest competitor by a large margin of 43,193 votes, according to results declared by the Election Commission of India

Biography
Ghoshal was born and brought up in a musical family. He was born to Amulya Chandra Ghoshal and Labanya Ghoshal.  Labanya had been the main source of inspiration for little Anup. She herself had a good voice. Apart from Anup, his elder sisters too were good singers in their respective capacities and that made the perfect musical environment for Anup to imbibe music into his inner self.

When he was 4, his mother arranged for his musical training. She understood that she had given birth to a musical maestro. His first performance took place at 4½, when he sang for a children's programme, Shishu Mahal from All India Radio, Kolkata.

Ghoshal's music lessons which began from the age of four continued till he was about 26 yrs of age. During his entire learning years he became a master of Thumri, Kheyal, Bhajan, Ragpradhan, Rabindra Sangeet, Nazrulgeeti, Dwijendrageeti, Rajnikanter Gaan, modern Bengali songs and several other folks songs. He received his music lessons from various esteemed 'Gurus'. Among them was late Sangeetacharya Sukhendu Goswami, the famous music maestro of Bengal. He learnt Rabindra Sangeet from the legendary Debabrata Biswas and learnt different Bengali songs from Manindra Chakraborty.

Apart from musical learnings he did his graduation in humanities from Asutosh College, Kolkata. He did his Masters as well as Ph. D from Rabindra Bharati University. His thesis was entitled "Nazrulgeeti - Roop O Rashanabhuti". During his school and college days, Anup took part in many reputed music competitions (All India) where he secured highest marks in different classical, light classical, Bengali songs (traditional and modern), Rabindra Sangeet and folk songs.

Anup stood first in 'Sangeet Bharati Degree Examination' (classical music) in the year 1966-67 and was awarded a gold medal. He is a National Scholar, selected in 1966-67 (securing highest position in classical music).

Anup's first venture into movies as a playback singer was at the age of 19 yrs, when he sang for the movie of all times, 'Goopy Gyne Bagha Byne ', by the legendary Satyajit Ray. His association with Ray continued which made him the rightful recipient of National Award in 1981 for 'Hirak Rajar Deshe'. He has sung for various Bengali as well as Hindi movies, and also in Bhojpuri and Assamese.

Dr. Ghoshal has visited UK, USA, Canada, Germany for various musical concerts. He has been equally appreciated in the countries abroad as has been in India. He still visits the Western countries to promote Indian Musical Culture with special reference to Bengali songs along with folk songs of Bengal.

Anup Ghoshal has also written an authoritative book on Indian Music, "Ganer Bhubane". He believes that music is universal and is the best unifying force. Researchers have proved that tribal music in India, from east to west and from north to south, is basically the same, only the notes have changed slightly due to different directions. There is a lot of similarity between the Russian folk songs and the Bengali Bhatiyali songs. He believes that the future of Indian classical music is bright.

Anup Ghoshal has been elected as one of the members of the West Bengal Legislative Assembly from Uttarpara Constituency (Hoogly 185) as a candidate of All India Trinamool Congress headed by Ms. Mamata Banerjee in 2011.

Accolades and awards
Ghoshal has been offered Honorary Citizen of Chicago in 1994 by Mayor Richard M. Daley, as well as other awards:
 Gold Medal in Sangeet Bharati Degree Examination during 1967-68.
 1992 Bengal Film Journalists' Association – Best Male Playback Award for the Bengali film Goopy Bagha Phire Elo
 1983 Bengal Film Journalists' Association – Best Male Playback Award for the Hindi film Masoom
 1981 National Film Award for Best Male Playback Singer for the Bengali film Hirak Rajar Deshe
 1971 Bengal Film Journalists' Association – Best Male Playback Award for the Bengali film Sagina Mahato

Selected filmography
As Playback Singer
 Goopy Gyne Bagha Byne
 Hirak Rajar Deshe
 Goopy Bagha Phire Elo
 Sasti
 Atattatar Din Porey
 Nayikar Bumikay
 Kabi
 Chhadabeshi
 Jiban Jerakam
 Nimantran
 Phuleswari
 Biraj Bou
 Mohun Baganer Meye
 Subarnagolok
 Bancharamer Bagan
 Harmonium
 Ek Je Chhilo Desh
 Ajab Gayer Ajab Kotha
 Sagina Mahato
 Nishantey (1985)

Well-known songs

Tujse Naraz Nehi Zindegi from Masoom
Husn Bhi Aap Hain, Ishq Bhi Aap Hain
Tum saath ho zindagi bhar ke liye from Sheeshay ka ghar

As Music director

 Sagina Mahato

Filmography (As Music Director)

Sagina Mahato (Bengali Film)

Ghoshal also assisted Satyajit Ray in his Bengali films as assistant music director.

References

External links
Anup Ghoshal in Gomolo.in
Kolkata swinging to patriotic beat
Culture date with Bengal

Living people
Bengali Hindus
Bengali singers
Bengal Film Journalists' Association Award winners
Indian male playback singers
Singers from Kolkata
Asutosh College alumni
University of Calcutta alumni
Rabindra Bharati University alumni
20th-century Indian singers
Best Male Playback Singer National Film Award winners
Year of birth missing (living people)
20th-century Indian male singers